Richard Gibson (born December 13, 1953) is a Canadian composer of contemporary classical music, and Professor of Composition at the Université de Moncton in New Brunswick.

He is an Associate Composer of the Canadian Music Centre, and a member of the Canadian League of Composers.

Gibson has also been active as a producer for classical recordings. One of these – the New Brunswick Youth Orchestra's Forbidden City Tour CD – won an East Coast Music Award (ECMA) in 2008 for Classical Recording of the Year.

Education 
 B.Mus., Dalhousie University (Steve Tittle, composition)
 M.Mus., University of Western Ontario (Peter Paul Koprowski, composition)
 PhD, King's College London (David Lumsdaine, composition)

Awards 
 1983 – First Prize, Society of Composers, Authors and Music Publishers of Canada (SOCAN) competition for young composers
 1992 – New Brunswick Award for Excellence in Arts

Compositions

Solo works 
 Nightingales for Katy (flute) 1982
 Cantilena (guitar) 1984
 Sonate (saxophone) 1984
 Resonances (percussion) 1985
 Sept Miniatures (guitar) 1986
 Hemispheres (bass guitar) 1987
 Prélude, Fugue et Allegro Vivace (piano) 1987
 25 Préludes (piano) 1996
 Cora (percussion) 2000
 Lepidoptera (piano) 2002
 You gotta move (trumpet) 2002
 Julia – Variaciones sobre un tema de Juan Lennon (guitar) 2013

Chamber works 
 Les Îles (12 brass) 1976
 Oboe Piece (oboe, piano) 1976
 Free Flight I (trumpet, fixed media) 1977
 What? Not Another Dance! (3 percussion) 1977
 Oboe Metamorphosis (oboe, fixed media) 1978
 Capriccio (flute, 4 percussion) 1979
 Pattern Music (bass guitar, 2 synthesizers) 1980
 Jazz Poems (5 jazz players, live electronics) 1981
 Free Flight II (trumpet, double bass, percussion) 1983
 Passacaille (violin, piano) 1988
 Changing Perspectives (string quartet) 1990
 The Mindfulness of Breathing (4 tubas) 1990
 Conversation Piece (flute, oboe, bass clarinet, trumpet, piano) 1991
 Neuf Cartes Postales de Cornwall (violin, viola) 1992
 Les Cloches de Kastelli (4 percussion) 1994
 Montañas del Fuego (clarinet, percussion) 1995
 Seven Pieces (bass clarinet, piano) 1995
 Le Barachois (violin, cello, piano) 1996
 Canzona (11 brass) 1997
 Éloges pour Han-Shen (4 percussion) 1998
 April Remembered (violin, double bass) 1999
 Mouvement Polyphonique (3 trombones, piano) 2001
 Guitar Quartet (4 guitars) 2002

Vocal works 
 Glistenin' Whistle (mixed chorus, flute, French horn, 2 trumpets, trombone, tuba, guitar, violin, bass guitar, percussion) 1976
 Parfums Exotiques (soprano, flute, cello, piano) 1976
 Beatus Vir (mixed chorus) 1987
 Hidden Rivers (soprano, piano) 1987
 The Gravity of Earth (speaker, synthesizers, percussion, string orchestra, live electronics) 1988
 Nisi Dominus (soloists, 4 choruses, orchestra) 1989
 Remembering a Woman's Voice (soprano, cello) 1990
 White Pearls (baritone, clarinet, French horn, cello, percussion) 1991
 Cinq Poèmes de Raymond Guy Leblanc (soprano, lute, 4 percussion, string quartet) 1993
 Transfigured Autumn (mixed chorus, small orchestra) 1993
 For Daniel (tenor, piano) 1995
 Trois Chants Klingons (soprano, 4 flutes, synthesizer, 2 percussion, live electronics) 1995
 Poème du Mois de Juillet (soloists, speaker, mixed chorus, 9 percussion) 1999

Works for large ensemble 
 Synchrony (symphonic band) 1978
 Concerto (trombone, orchestra) 1982
 Mantras (youth orchestra) 1987
 Musique Solennelle (small orchestra) 1987
 November Music (14 strings) 1990
 Étude Chromatique (symphonic band) 1994
 Sinfonietta (symphonic band) 1994
 Symphony (orchestra) 1994
 A Festive Overture (orchestra) 2000
 Neo-Baroque Suite (youth string orchestra) 2002

Discography 
 Et + Ke 2 – Amerythme (Atlantica Musique 02002) – 1994 (contains Les Cloches de Kastelli for 4 percussion)
 Canadian Music for Clarinet – James Mark, clarinet – 1999 (contains Montañas Del Fuego for clarinet and percussion)
 Nightingales for Katy – Karin Aurell, flute – 2005 (contains Nightingales for Katy for flute)
 Piano Atlantica – Barbara Pritchard, piano (Centrediscs CMC CD 15210) – 2010 (contains Variation and excerpts from 25 Préludes)
 Richard Boulanger joue Richard Gibson – musique pour piano seul – 2015 (contains Le 24 décembre 2004, Lepidoptera, 24 Notes, 25 Préludes (excerpts), Prélude, Fugue et Allegro Vivace, and Sarabande)

References 

1953 births
Living people
Musicians from Charlottetown
Canadian classical composers
Dalhousie University alumni
University of Western Ontario alumni
Alumni of King's College London
Academic staff of the Université de Moncton